Yeh Ishq Samajh Na Aaye is a Pakistani drama television series, directed by Jasim Abbas. It features Mikaal Zulfiqar, Zarnish Khan, Sharoze Sabzwari and Syeda Tuba Anwar in lead roles.

Cast
Mikaal Zulfiqar as Hassan
Zarnish Khan as Rida Hassan
Shehroz Sabzwari as Shahaan
Syeda Tuba Anwar as Nimra
Saleem Sheikh as Jan Muhammad

Production

Casting
In 2021, Zulfiqar revealed working in a project along with Zarnish Khan. Set in Islamabad, the serial revealed to be produced by "Studio Vision Films" and directed by Jasim Abbas. It marks second collaboration of Abbas with the same production house after Ahl-e-Wafa. The serial marks second appearance of Zulfiqar and Khan together after De Ijazat. Shahroze and Tuba also revealed to be part of the project.

Released
Initially, "Yeh Ishq Samajh Na Aaye" was speculated to be released on ARY Digital, However, later it was revealed that it will air on new channel "Aur Life" on its launch. The teasers of the drama released in January 2022. It premiered on February 20, 2022, airing weekly episodes on Sunday at prime time i.e., 8:00 PM.

References

2022 Pakistani television series debuts
Pakistani drama television series
Urdu-language television shows
2022 Pakistani television series endings